MRP2 may refer to:
 Multidrug resistance-associated protein 2
 Manufacturing resource planning (MRP2 or MRP II)